The University Alliance of the Silk Road (also translated as the Universities Alliance of the Silk Road and abbreviated UASR) is an academic arm to the People's Republic of China's One Belt, One Road foreign policy initiative.  The UASR is a non-profit university alliance based at Xi'an Jiaotong University, a C9 League university in western China. The mission of the UASR is to build educational collaboration and promote economic growth in countries along the Silk Road Economic Belt.

History

The UASR was founded in 2015 with approximately 100 universities from 22 countries.  It currently includes 132 universities across 32 countries and regions on 5 continents.  The program has become a central part of the 2016 plan of the Ministry of Education (中华人民共和国教育部) of the People's Republic of China for educational development along the Belt and Road region via student exchange and joint research.

Scope
The UASR was charged with supporting training, research, policy, cross-cultural understanding, and medical service.  The UASR includes an international alliance of law schools, which Xi'an Jiaotong president Shuguo Wang notes aims ``to promote the exchanges of law among the alliance member countries and focus on legal consensus, in order to serve the Belt and Road development with legal spirit and legal culture."  In addition, the UASR sponsors international cultural events including the UASR Educational Exhibition and Cultural Festival.

Members

Member universities include the following:

Africa
 Banha University, Egypt

Asia
 Harbin Institute of Technology, China
 Xi’an Jiaotong University, China
 The University of Hong Kong, Hong Kong SAR of China
 Chinese University of Hong Kong, Hong Kong SAR of China
 City University of Hong Kong, Hong Kong SAR of China
 Hong Kong Polytechnic University, Hong Kong SAR of China
 University of Macau, Macau SAR of China
 Nazarbayev University, Kazakhstan
 Al-Farabi Kazakh National University, Kazakhstan
 Kazakh Academy of Transport and Communications, Kazakhstan
 International University of Central Asia, Kazakhstan
 Ishenaly Arabaev Kyrgyz State University, Kyrgyzstan
 Kyrgyz State University of Construction, Transport and Architecture, Kyrgyzstan
 International University of Innovation Technologies, Kyrgyzstan
 Waikato Institute of Technology, New Zealand
 National University of Sciences and Technology, Pakistan
 Far Eastern Federal University, Russia
 National University of Singapore, Singapore
 Pusan National University, South Korea
 Hanyang University, South Korea
 Tajik National University for Research and Sciences, Tajikistan
 Chiang Mai University, Thailand
 Hacettepe University, Turkey

Australia
 University of New South Wales, Australia
 Charles Darwin University, Australia
 The University of Newcastle, Australia.

Europe
 University of Liverpool, United Kingdom
 Vistula University, Poland
 Peoples' Friendship University of Russia, Russia
 Bauman Moscow State Technical University, Russia
 Moscow Power Engineering Institute, Russia
 Moscow Aviation Institute, Russia
 Peter the Great St. Petersburg Polytechnic University, Russia
 Tampere University of Technology, Finland
 Ecole des Ponts ParisTech, France
 Centrale-Supélec, France
 SKEMA Business School, France
 Politecnico di Milano, Italy
 University of Torino, Italy
 University of Pavia, Italy
 University of Aberdeen, United Kingdom
 University of Zagreb, Croatia
UCAM Universidad Católica de Murcia, Spain

North America
 Washington University in St. Louis, USA

Physical location
The UASR is headquartered in the Western China Science and Technology Innovation Harbor, with space designed to promote collaborations with partner universities in university-level exchanges, talent education, and scientific research, and of building international think-tanks.

References

Education in China
Higher education in China
Foreign relations of China
Belt and Road Initiative
International college and university associations and consortia